Hopkinton High School may refer to:

 Hopkinton High School (New Hampshire) located in Hopkinton, New Hampshire
 Hopkinton High School (Massachusetts) located in Hopkinton, Massachusetts